The Baldachu EP is an EP by the San Diego, California pop rock band Reeve Oliver, released in 2004.

Track listing
"I Want Burns"
"Young and Dumb"
"Thriller"
"Imposter"
"Waste It"
"Madachu"

Performers
Sean O'Donnell - vocals, guitar
O (Otis R.) - bass
Brad Davis - drums

Reeve Oliver albums
2004 EPs